Leeds Rugby Limited is the 'Worlds First Dual Rugby Partnership', between the main Rugby league and Rugby Union sides in the city of Leeds, these being the Leeds Rhinos (Rugby League) and Leeds Tykes (Rugby Union).  Both teams played at the Headingley Carnegie Stadium until Leeds Tykes moves out ahead of the 2020–21 season.

See also

List of Super League rugby league club owners
List of owners of English football clubs
List of professional sports team owners

References

External links

Leeds Rhinos
Leeds Tykes
Sport in Leeds
Rugby football organisations